Meadow Heights is a suburb in Melbourne, Victoria, Australia,  north of Melbourne's Central Business District, located within the City of Hume local government area. Meadow Heights recorded a population of 14,890 at the 2021 census.

Meadow Heights is bounded by Somerton Road in the north, Pascoe Vale Road in the east, Barry Road in the south and the Broadmeadows Valley Park in the west.

History

Until gazetted as a suburb in the late 1990s, Meadow Heights was a housing estate within Coolaroo.

Meadow Heights underwent a property boom in the late 1980s and early 1990s, as demand for new houses rose, forcing prospective buyers into the outer suburban area. Meadow Heights Post Office opened on 6 March 1995.

In recent years, developers have focused their efforts on suburbs to the north, with very few new housing projects being completed since 2000.

Demographics

The most common ancestries in Meadow Heights were 23.2% Turkish, 10.1% Australian, 8.9% English, 6.8% Lebanese and 5.0% Iraqi. 49.6% of people were born in Australia. The most common countries of birth were 12.8% Turkey, 8.8% Iraq, 3.4% Lebanon, 2.9% Vietnam and 1.3% New Zealand. 24.9% of people only spoke English at home. Other languages spoken at home included 26.3% Turkish, 15.5% Arabic, 5.0% Vietnamese, 4.8% Assyrian Neo-Aramaic, 3.5% Chaldean Neo-Aramaic and 1.3% Spanish. The most common responses for religion in Meadow Heights were 42.1% Islam, 26.5% Catholic, 6.7% No Religion, 3.6% Anglican and 3.3% Eastern Orthodox.

Education

Meadow Heights has two primary schools (Meadow Heights Primary School and Bethal Primary School) and several childcare centres.

Places of interest

Meadow Heights offers several places of interest, with the nearest cinema complex located to the south, in Broadmeadows. There are several youth centres for social activities and there is a soccer team in the area.

There are around four milk bars; on Bicentennial Crescent and Magnolia Boulevard in the north, Taggerty Crescent in the centre, and one on Eldorado Crescent to the south.

The main shopping centre is the Meadow Heights Shopping Centre, which is located on Paringa Boulevard. It features a SUPA IGA Supermarket and over 25 specialty shops.

There is also a mosque in Meadow Heights, near the shopping centre.

A community centre and a skate bowl are located in the Buchan Street Reserve.

Meadow Heights has parks all throughout the suburb, the most largest of which is the Broadmeadows Valley Park, which starts from Meadow Heights right down to Jacana, with a bike trail alongside. The park has soccer fields and playgrounds near Barry Road and Magnolia Boulevard, providing barbecue and picnic areas for residents. Shankland Wetlands has a variety of introduced and native birds. The wetlands is located south of Meadow Heights, at the end of Barry Road.

Transport

Bus
Six bus routes service Meadow Heights.

The following bus routes run through Meadow Heights:
 : Broadmeadows station – Craigieburn North via Meadow Heights. Operated by Dysons.
 : Roxburgh Park station – Pascoe Vale station via Meadow Heights, Broadmeadows and Glenroy. Operated by Dysons.

The following bus routes travel along the boundaries of Meadow Heights:
 : Broadmeadows station – Roxburgh Park station via Greenvale. Operated by CDC Melbourne.
 : Greenvale Gardens – Roxburgh Park station via Greenvale Village Shopping Centre. Operated by CDC Melbourne.
 : Frankston station – Melbourne Airport ( service). Operated by Kinetic Melbourne.
 : Broadmeadows station – Craigieburn via Roxburgh Park ( service, operates Saturday and Sunday mornings only). Operated by Ventura Bus Lines.

Road
Meadow Heights is bordered by Pascoe Vale Road on the east, parkland on the west, Barry Road on the south and Somerton Road to the north.

The area is also served extensively by local taxi companies.

Train 
Coolaroo and Roxburgh Park are the nearest railway stations to Meadow Heights. Both are located on the Craigieburn line.

See also
 City of Broadmeadows – Meadow Heights was previously within this former local government area.

References

External links

Suburbs of Melbourne
Suburbs of the City of Hume